KRI Pasopati (410) (ex-Soviet submarine S-290) is a retired Project 613  of the Indonesian Navy.

Design 

The initial design was developed in the early 1940s as a sea-going follow on to the S-class submarine. As a result of war experience and the capture of German technology at the end of the war, the Soviets issued a new design requirement in 1946. The revised design was developed by the Lazurit Design Bureau based in Gorkiy. Like most conventional submarines designed 1946–1960, the design was heavily influenced by the Type XXI U-boat.

History 
Pasopati is one of twelve vessels delivered to the Indonesian Navy in 1962. Pasopati was involved in Operation Trikora in 1961 she was used to transport marines and arms to the Indonesian army in West Irian and during those operations she was badly damaged. She was retired in 1994 after more than 30 years of service, disassembled and moved to a spot near Plaza Surabaya before being reassembled and turned into a museum which opened in 1998.

Gallery

References

Bibliography
 

Whiskey-class submarines
1955 ships
Submarines of Indonesia
Museum ships in Indonesia
Ships built in the Soviet Union